The Meadowbank Power Station is a run-of-the-river hydroelectric power station located in the Central Highlands region of Tasmania, Australia. The power station is situated on the  Lower River Derwent catchment and is owned and operated by Hydro Tasmania.

Technical details
Part of the Derwent scheme that comprises eleven hydroelectric power stations, the Meadowbank Power Station is the final power station in the scheme. The power station is located aboveground below Meadowbank Lake, a small storage created by the concrete buttressed Meadowbank Dam on the Derwent River. The facilities at the Meadowbank Power Station are simple and include the dam, intake structure with intake gate designed to cut off full flow, a short penstock which is integral with the dam, the power station building, generator equipment and associated facilities.

Within the station building, the turbine has a five-bladed runner and concrete spiral casing. Pre-stressed cables passing through the stay vanes anchor the spiral casing and form part of the station foundation. No inlet valve is installed in the station. The station output, estimated to be  annually, is fed to TasNetworks' transmission grid via parallel 11 kV/220 kV Siemens generator transformers to the outdoor switchyard.

Water discharged from the Meadowbank Power Station flows into the River Derwent.

2016 energy crisis
In 2016, the power station was the location of diesel generators required to supplement the power into the Tasmanian grid due to the 2016 Tasmanian energy crisis and the failure of the Basslink cable.

See also 

List of power stations in Tasmania

References

External links
Hydro Tasmania page on the Lower Derwent

Central Highlands (Tasmania)
Energy infrastructure completed in 1967
Hydroelectric power stations in Tasmania
Energy crisis, 2016
1967 establishments in Australia